Jacinta Escudos, born in San Salvador, is a writer whose body of work includes novels, short stories, poetry, creative nonfiction, and journalistic chronicles that have been published in such Central American daily outlets as La Nación (Costa Rica), La Prensa Gráfica (El Salvador), and El Nuevo Diario (Nicaragua). While she primarily writes in Spanish, she is fluent in English, German, and French, having worked as a translator for several years. She has traveled extensively and lived in various Central American countries and Europe. The pluralities of these cultural and geographical fusions manifest themselves in her literary production and intellectual thought. Her novel, A-B-Sudario (Alfaguara, 2003), was awarded the Mario Monteforte Toledo Central American Prize for Fiction (Premio Centroamericano de Novela Mario Monteforte Toledo). She has also received residencies by La Maison des Écrivains Étrangers et des Traducteurs in Saint-Nazaire, France and Heinrich Böll Haus in Langenbroich, Germany.

Although a prolific author with many publications, the majority of Escudos's work remains unpublished. Despite the often limited means of literary circulation in Central America, some of Escudos's unpublished work has nonetheless been recognized. In 2002, for instance, Escudos won a national contest in El Salvador, the Tenth Annual Literary Contest of Ahuachapán (Décimos Juegos Florales de Ahuachapán) for her book, Crónicas para sentimentales.

Escudos's narrative voice engages with experimental forms and techniques. This experimentation is intentional, one that structures and situates her work through the opening of possibilities in relationship to selfhood and space. This narrative voice and its relationship to other literary maps is demonstrated in Escudos's current participation in the blogosphere. Her official blog, Jacintario, is a regularly updated medium––an extension of Escudos's writing that operates as a daily form of expression where the author's voice, and content, varies. As an online cultural magazine, Jacintario contributes to the blogosphere not simply because it is a production by an eminent literary figure, but because of the immediacy and access the blog offers in relationship to a genre in the making.

Publications 
Escudos's notable literary enterprises include: 
 Crónicas para sentimentales (F&G Editores, 2010)
 El Diablo sabe mi nombre (Uruk editores, 2008)
 A-B-Sudario (Alfaguara, 2003)
 Felicidad doméstica y otras cosas aterradoras (Editorial X, 2002)
 El Desencanto (Dirección de Publicaciones e Impresos, 2001)
 Cuentos Sucios (Dirección de Publicaciones e Impresos, 1997)
 Contra-corriente (UCA Editores, 1993)
 Apuntes de una historia de amor que no fue (UCA Editores, 1987)

Her work, in addition, has been featured in the following collections:
 Idea crónica: Literatura de no ficción iberoamericana (Fundación TyPA, 2006)
 El Milagrero/Der Wundertäter (DTV, 2006)
 Literaturas centroamericanas hoy (Iberoamericana/Vervuert Verlag, 2005)
 Antología de cuentistas salvadoreñas (UCA Editores, 2004)
  Cicatrices: un retrato del cuento centroamericano (Anamá Ediciones, 2004)
 Pequeñas resistencias 2: Antología del cuento centroamericano contemporáneo (Páginas de Espuma, 2003)
 Um etwas Zeit zu retten: Literatur und Kunst im Heinrich-Böll-Haus Langenbroich (Heinrich Böll Stiftung, 2003)
 Papayas und Bananen: Erotische und andere Erzählungen aus Zentralamerika (Brandes & Apsel Verlag, 2002)
 Los centroamericanos: (Antología de cuentos) (Alfaguara, 2002)
 Cuentos centroamericanos (Editorial Andrés Bello, 2000)
 Cuentistas hispanoamericanas: Antología (Literal Books, 1996)
 And We Sold the Rain: Contemporary Fiction from Central America (Seven Stories Press, 1996, 2nd Edition [1988])
 Lovers and Comrades: Women's Resistance Poetry from Central America (The Women's Press, 1989)
 You Can't Drown the Fire: Latin American Women Writing in Exile (Cleis Press, 1988)
 Ixok Amar-Go: Central American Women's Poetry for Peace/Poesia de mujeres centroamericanas por la paz (Granite Press, 1987)

External links 
 Jacintario (Official Author's Blog)

1961 births
Living people
People from San Salvador
Salvadoran translators
Salvadoran poets
Salvadoran novelists
Salvadoran journalists
Salvadoran women essayists
Salvadoran women poets
Salvadoran women short story writers
Salvadoran women journalists
20th-century translators
20th-century short story writers
20th-century Salvadoran writers
21st-century Salvadoran writers
20th-century Salvadoran women writers
21st-century Salvadoran women writers
Women novelists
English–Spanish translators
French–Spanish translators
German–Spanish translators